Reußen station is a railway station in the municipality of Reußen, located in the Saalekreis district in Saxony-Anhalt, Germany.

References

Railway stations in Saxony-Anhalt
Buildings and structures in Saalekreis